Orthophytum lucidum is a plant species in the genus Orthophytum. This species is native to Brazil.

References

lucidum
Flora of Brazil